Tracy Williams is an American professional wrestler currently wrestling for Ring of Honor (ROH) where he is a former ROH World Tag Team Champion with Foundation teammate Rhett Titus. He is also a former ROH World Television Champion.

Prior to ROH, he was known for his time in Evolve, where he is a former two-time Evolve Tag Team Champion.

Professional wrestling career

Evolve (2014–2018) 

Williams made his debut at Evolve on September 14, 2014, at Evolve 35, losing to Timothy Thatcher.

On May 30, 2015, at EVOLVE 43, Williams and Drew Gulak failed to capture the Open the United Gate Championship, when they were defeated by Johnny Gargano and Rich Swann. Williams has held the EVOLVE Tag Team championship with Drew Gulak and Fred Yehi, respectively, representing the stable Catch Point. At EVOLVE 113, Williams had his last match with the promotion, losing against EVOLVE Champion Shane Strickland. After that, he left the promotion.

Ring of Honor (2018–2021) 

Williams made his Ring of Honor debut on Survival of the Fittest (2018). He participated in the Survival of the Fittest tournament, where he was eliminated at the first round by Jonathan Gresham.  At a ROH taping in Atlanta, Georgia, Williams would join Juice Robinson, David Finlay, Mark Haskins, Bandido and Tenille Dashwood in forming a new faction named ‘Lifeblood’. However, after the departures of Dashwood and Robinson from the promotion, Lifeblood would quietly disband and Williams would find himself once again in singles competition. In September 2020, Williams competed in the ROH Pure Tournament for the ROH Pure Championship where he defeated Rust Taylor in the first round, Fred Yehi in the second round and Jay Lethal in the semi-finals but lost to Jonathan Gresham in the finals. Following this, Williams would join Lethal, Gresham and Rhett Titus in forming a new faction known as The Foundation.

On March 26, 2021, Williams became a double champion, winning the ROH World Television Championship by defeating Kenny King - who was filling in for the injured recognized champion Dragon Lee, and also the ROH World Tag Team Championship, teaming with Titus to defeat King and La Bestia del Ring - who himself was subbing for recognized champion Dragon Lee.  Williams would then lose the TV Title to Tony Deppen on Ring of Honor Wrestling (aired May 1, 2021, but the exact match date is unknown due to it being at a closed door taping).

Championships and accomplishments
Absolute Intense Wrestling
AIW Absolute Championship (1 time)
AIW Tag Team Championship (2 times) – with Tyson Dux
JT Lightning Invitational Tournament (2017)
 Chikara
King of Trios (2011) - with Fire Ant and Soldier Ant
Evolve
Evolve Tag Team Championship (2 times) – with Drew Gulak (1) and Fred Yehi (1)
Forza Lucha!
Forza Lucha Cup (2016)
IndependentWrestling.TV
Independent Wrestling Championship (1 times)
Pro Wrestling Illustrated
Ranked No. 90 of the top 500 singles wrestlers in the PWI 500 in 2021
 Ring Of Honor
ROH World Tag Team Championship (1 time) - with Rhett Titus
ROH World Television Championship (1 time)
ROH Year-End Award (2 times)
 Faction of the Year (2020) – 
 Match of the Year (2020) –

References

External links
 
 
 
 

21st-century professional wrestlers
American male professional wrestlers
Living people
1989 births
Professional wrestlers from New York (state)
People from Brooklyn
ROH World Television Champions
ROH World Tag Team Champions
Professional wrestlers from New York City